KleenSpeed Technologies is a Silicon Valley based company founded in 2007 to create electric vehicle systems.

Description
The founders of Kleenspeed Technologies Inc. are Timothy Collins, Jerry Kroll and Peter J. Sprague.

KleenSpeed Technologies Inc. is a developer of Lithium-ion Energy Storage technologies for the Automotive and Energy Industries.

In operation since 2007, KleenSpeed has been developing Electric Propulsion Technology, Energy Storage, and proprietary Battery Management Systems.

One of their race cars, the KleenSpeed EV-X1, won the ReFuel Electric time trial four years in a row. 

The KleenSpeed World KAR was announced at the 2012 San Francisco Auto Show.

The company was based at the NASA Ames Research Center at Mountain View, California.

Assets of KleenSpeed were sold to Flux Power in 2014 and its founder, Timothy Collins, died in 2017 of lung cancer.

References

External links
 
 Official Electric Vehicles Research IDTech website

Battery electric vehicle manufacturers
Plug-in hybrid vehicle manufacturers
Electric vehicle manufacturers of the United States
Companies based in Mountain View, California
Ames Research Center
Technology companies based in the San Francisco Bay Area